The Abbot of Balmerino (later Commendator of Balmerino) was the head of the Cistercian monastic community and lands of Balmerino Abbey, Fife, founded in  1227 x 1229 by monks from Melrose Abbey with the patronage of Ermengarde de Beaumont and King Alexander II of Scotland. The following are a list of abbots and commendators. 


List of abbots
 Alan, 1229-1236
 Radulf, 1236-1251
 John, 1251-1252
 Adam, 1252-1260
 Adam, 1260-1270
 William de Perisby, 1270
 Thomas, 1270x1306
 William, 1296
 Alan, 1317
 Hugh, x1369
 Patrick, 1369-1380x
 John Plater, x 1392
 John Gugy, x 1394-1399 x 1402
 John de Hailes, 1399x1402-1435x1436
 Richard de Coventry, 1436-1464 
 William Cameron, 1436
 Henry Mason, 1450
 Walter Bunch, 1464
 James Rait, 1466-1468 x 1469
 William Bell, 1468-1483
 Walter Bunch (again), 1482-1486 x 1504
 Walter Ruch, 1483
 Henry Knollis, 1484
 Robert Fairweather, 1486
 James Forman, 1504-1507
 Robert Forrester, 1511-1559 x 1561
 Henry Roche, 1532
 John Stewart, 1535

List of commendators
 John Hay, 1561-1573
 Henry Kinnear, 1574-1603
 John Kinnear, 1582
 Robert Auchmutie, 1604-1607

Notes

Bibliography
 Cowan, Ian B. & Easson, David E., Medieval Religious Houses: Scotland With an Appendix on the Houses in the Isle of Man, Second Edition, (London, 1976), pp. 72–3
 Watt, D.E.R. & Shead, N.F. (eds.), The Heads of Religious Houses in Scotland from the 12th to the 16th Centuries, The Scottish Records Society, New Series, Volume 24, (Edinburgh, 2001), pp. 12–15

See also
 Balmerino Abbey

Balmerino
Balmerino
Lists of abbots